Kelowna International Airport  is a Canadian airport located approximately 10 minutes or  northeast of Kelowna, British Columbia, Canada, on Highway 97.

The single runway airport operates scheduled air service to Vancouver, Victoria, Calgary, Edmonton, Toronto, Montreal, and Seattle, as well as less frequent seasonal service to Cancún, Puerto Vallarta, Los Cabos, and Phoenix. Currently, the airport handles up to 36 commercial departures a day, or approximately 248 departures per week. Three major airlines serve the airport; Air Canada, Alaska Airlines, and WestJet.

In 2018, YLW overtook Victoria International Airport to become Canada's 10th busiest airport by passenger traffic with 2,080,372, representing a 9.9% increase over 2017.

History 
In 1946, a plebiscite was held which authorized the city of Kelowna to purchase the 320-acre Dickson Ranch for $20,000. The airport was opened in 1947 with a 3,000 foot long grass airstrip and a small terminal. Commercial service first began in 1958 by Canadian Pacific Airlines to Vancouver. In 1960, the runway was paved and extended to 5,350 feet. Through the 1960s and 1970s the airport continued to be expanded with a new terminal building, an air traffic control tower, and an onsite weather office. From the late 1960s to the mid 1980s, Pacific Western Airlines was the primary passenger air carrier serving the airport with Boeing 737-200 jetliners on nonstop and direct flights between Kelowna and Calgary, Edmonton, Vancouver and other small cities in British Columbia with the airline also operating Convair 640 and de Havilland Canada DHC-6 Twin Otter turboprops as well as Douglas DC-3 and Piper Navajo prop aircraft on regional flights. By 1985, Pacific Western had become an all-jet airline and was operating up to sixteen departures a day with the Boeing 737-200 from Kelowna including direct, no change of plane service to Toronto. Throughout the 1980s and 1990s commercial and cargo traffic increased, necessitating more than $10 million of investment in upgrades to the terminal building, runway and airline operating facilities.

In 1996, Greyhound Air was flying daily nonstop service to its hub in Winnipeg with direct one stop service to Hamilton, Ontario, with Boeing 727-200 jetliners operated by local company Kelowna Flightcraft Air Charter (now KF Cargo). Also in 1996, WestJet was operating nonstop Boeing 737-200 jet service to Calgary, Edmonton, Vancouver and Victoria, British Columbia, as well as direct one stop 737 service to Regina.

In 1998, a $20 million expansion program doubled the size of the terminal building, increased parking, and expanded airside facilities to accommodate the projected 1 million passengers by 2011. By 1999, five airlines were serving Kelowna: Air BC with code sharing flights on behalf of Air Canada, Central Mountain Air with code sharing flights also on behalf of Air Canada, Canadian Regional Airlines with code sharing flights including Fokker F28 Fellowship jet service on behalf of Canadian Airlines, Horizon Air with code sharing flights on behalf of Alaska Airlines, and WestJet with the latter air carrier continuing to operate Boeing 737-200 jets on all of its flights at this time.

Terminal facilities

There are 10 aircraft loading positions, half of which are fitted with jet bridges. The arrivals area contains three baggage carousels, one of which can be cordoned off to accommodate international/US arrivals (and remaining two for domestic arrivals) and Canadian Customs processing. (The airport has a CATSA pre-board screening area, but not US pre-boarding clearance zone.)

Several food and beverage services, including Tim Horton's and White Spot Legends Restaurant, newsstands (Skyway Gifts and News), and tourist-related retail stores (Okanagan Estate Wine Cellar), in addition to a limited selection of duty-free goods (Okanagan Style and Duty Free), can be found in the terminal. The departure lounge features a wired business centre and complimentary wireless Internet. The airport's focal point is a glass rotunda which contains a fountain and the cylindrical glass sculpture "Escape from Stella Polaris" and Skyway Atrium Lounge. Kelowna Art Gallery operates a satellite site at the airport. A small observation area is located on the mezzanine level.

Airlines and destinations
Key destinations from the airport are Pacific Northwest (United States and Canada), Western Canada, Northern Canada, Toronto as well as seasonal connections to Southwestern United States, Mexico and Caribbean.

Passenger

Cargo

Statistics

Annual traffic

Ground transportation
Cars, buses and taxis can connect to the airport for Kelowna via Highway 97. The airport has an outdoor parking lot next to the terminal and some short term spaces near the terminal building.

Public transit
The airport is serviced by Kelowna Regional Route 23 and Vernon Regional Route 90 (rush hour service only) buses, which connect Vernon and Lake Country with UBC Okanagan Exchange in Kelowna. The airport is not served by the bus on evenings and weekends. Passengers heading to downtown Kelowna or West Kelowna can transfer to 97X Kelowna RapidBus at UBC Okanagan Exchange.

Future expansion
In 2006, the Kelowna International Airport Advisory Committee created the Master Plan 2025, a document dedicated to the expansion of the Kelowna International Airport. The Plan is expected to cost approximately $150 million. Due to YLW's unprecedented growth, a Master Plan was required to aid in keeping the airport at modern traffic handling standards. Also, the passenger terminal has been expanded so as to allow hourly processing of 680 passengers in 2015, and will be further expanded as to allow 900 passengers by 2025. Currently, the hourly rate is approximately 400 passengers. In order to do this, the terminal size will be nearly doubled, and a 2,400 space parkade will be constructed. Also, to reduce vehicular traffic congestion, a diamond overpass/underpass interchange will be constructed at the current intersection of Highway 97 and Airport Way.

Accidents and incidents
July 14, 1986: Pacific Western Airlines Flight 117, a Boeing 737-200 flying from Calgary International Airport to Vancouver International Airport with a stop in Kelowna, left the runway while landing in Kelowna and came to rest approximately  beyond the end of the runway. No fatalities or serious injuries were reported, but five crew members and 76 passengers suffered minor injuries.
February 4, 2009: At 10:40 PST, a two-seat Cessna 152 coming from Salmon Arm crash-landed on Kelowna Airport's main runway. The two passengers on board were uninjured.
January 7, 2013: WestJet Flight 150, a Boeing 737-700 scheduled to depart at 07:00 PST to Edmonton International Airport, slid off the tarmac in Kelowna while it was taxiing to be de-iced during a heavy snowfall. No injuries were reported among the 134 passengers on board.
October 13, 2016: Former Alberta premier Jim Prentice was among the four people killed in a small-plane crash in British Columbia that took off from Kelowna Airport. Prentice, 60, was aboard a twin-engine Cessna Citation that disappeared from radar shortly after takeoff from Kelowna, en route to the Springbank Airport, just outside Calgary.

See also
 List of airports in the Okanagan

References

External links
Kelowna International Airport Page from the City of Kelowna website
Master Plan 2025
Travel By Air page from the Tourism Kelowna website
Page about this airport on COPA's Places to Fly airport directory

National Airports System
Certified airports in British Columbia
Transport in Kelowna
Airports in the Okanagan
1947 establishments in British Columbia